ANU Press (or Australian National University Press; originally ANU E Press) is new university press (NUP) that publishes open-access books, textbooks and journals. It was established in 2004 to explore and enable new modes of scholarly publishing. In 2014, ANU E Press changed its name to ANU Press to reflect the changes the publication industry had seen since its foundation.

History 
ANU Press was Australia's first primarily electronic academic publisher.

ANU Press justified its foundation by mentioning the desire to publish scholarly works that would not necessarily gain profit, and the belief that online publishing was a viable alternative to traditional academic publishing that overcame the inaccessibility, costs, and requirements for setup that were inherent in traditional publishing.

Activities 
ANU Press produces on average 50–60 fully peer-reviewed research publications each year, and maintains a website featuring over 700 recent and back-list titles. It is recognised by the Department of Industry as a commercial publisher, enabling ANU Press authors to gain full recognition under the Higher Education Research Data Collection scheme.

Nearly all books and journals published by the Press are available in PDF, epub, mobi and HTML formats. All works are also available to purchase in hard copy through a Print-on-Demand (PoD) service.

ANU Press is multidisciplinary; it has 24 subject-specific editorial boards to evaluate monograph submissions and publishes 10 journals covering a wide range of disciplines. In order to ensure that the Press publishes only high-quality academic books, each submission goes through a rigorous selection process including evaluation by the relevant editorial board, a double-blind peer-review process, revision following reviewers’ reports and final approval by the board. This process ensures that the research is current, relevant and an important contribution to the field.

Imprints 

ANU Press is the imprint under which all peer-reviewed monographs, multi-author works, edited works, serials and journals are published. There is no requirement that works be produced by ANU affiliated researchers, authors or editors: ANU Press welcomes submissions from external sources.

 was established in 2009, in response to the growing need for an outlet for the exceptional student writing being produced by ANU students.  publishes a range of materials including conference papers, student journals, republications of important academic works and other internally referred University material.

 was launched in 2013, and provides an open access option for ANU academics looking to develop and distribute their textbooks.

Co-publishers 
ANU Press has co-publishing agreements with a number of organisations including: the Australian Centre on China in the World; the Centre for Aboriginal Economic Policy Research; the Australian and New Zealand School of Government; Charles Darwin University; Aboriginal History Inc.; and Social Sciences Academic Press (China).

Open Access 
All research published by ANU Press is available through Open Access, which allows it to be disseminated free of charge to readers all around the world. In this way, ANU Press supports the Australian National University's commitment towards research that contributes to societal transformation, recognising that research, no matter how thorough, innovative or world-changing, is only useful if it is made readily available to those who can use it best rather than being treated as a commodity accessible only to those who can afford it.

Journal publications
ANU Press publishes or co-publishes a number of academic journals, including:
Aboriginal History
Agenda

Australian Journal of Biography and History
East Asia Forum Quarterly
Human Ecology Review 
International Review of Environmental History

See also
Pacific Linguistics

References

External links
 ANU Press home page

2004 establishments in Australia
Australian National University
Open access publishers
Academic publishing companies
University presses of Australia
Book publishing companies of Australia
Publishing companies established in 2004
Online publishing companies